Ute Hasse (born 16 September 1963 in Düren) is a German former swimmer who competed in the 1984 Summer Olympics.

References

1963 births
Living people
German female swimmers
German female breaststroke swimmers
Olympic swimmers of West Germany
Swimmers at the 1984 Summer Olympics
Olympic silver medalists for West Germany
European Aquatics Championships medalists in swimming
Medalists at the 1984 Summer Olympics
Olympic silver medalists in swimming
People from Düren
Sportspeople from Cologne (region)
20th-century German women